Rupert Ethelbert Dodd (19 January 1907 – 16 January 1998) was an Australian rules footballer who played with Essendon and Hawthorn in the Victorian Football League (VFL).

Notes

External links 

1907 births
1998 deaths
Australian rules footballers from Victoria (Australia)
Essendon Football Club players
Hawthorn Football Club players
Keilor Football Club players